The 2007 Four Continents Figure Skating Championships was an international figure skating competition in the 2006–07 season. It was held at the World Arena in Colorado Springs, USA on February 7–10. Medals were awarded in the disciplines of men's singles, ladies' singles, pair skating, and ice dancing.

Medals table

Results

Men

Ladies

Pairs
Jessica Dubé / Bryce Davison did not complete their free skating and so automatically withdrew. During a side-by-side camel spin, the two drifted too close to each other, and Davison's blade hit Dubé in the face. She was immediately taken to the hospital and underwent surgery to repair the damage. Dubé later made a complete recovery and the two were able to compete at the 2007 World Championships.

Ice dancing

References

External links
 
 

Four Continents Figure Skating Championships
Four Continents Figure Skating Championships
Sports competitions in Colorado Springs, Colorado
Four Continents
Four Continents Figure Skating Championships
Four Continents Figure Skating Championships
2000s in Colorado Springs, Colorado